Erdeniin Bat-Üül (born 1 July 1957) is a prominent Mongolian politician from the Democratic Party and a former Mayor of Ulaanbaatar City and Governor of the Capital City.

Early life and career
E. Bat-Üül was born in Ulaanbaatar on 1 July 1957. His father was Sengiin Erdene, one of Mongolia's most well-known authors. In 1975, he completed Ulaanbaatar's High School No. 1, and in 1981, he graduated from the physics department of the National University of Mongolia. From 1982 to 1985, he worked as a teacher in Renchinlkhümbe, Khövsgöl, and afterwards worked at the Astronomic Laboratory of Mongolian Academy of Sciences in Ulaanbaatar.

Mongolia's Democratic Revolution
In 1988, Bat-Üül was part of organizing a political group, which in December 1989, would become the first to articulate dissent against the ruling Mongolian People's Revolutionary Party. Shortly afterwards, all members of the group were arrested, but set free again on lack of evidence. Bat-Üül was one of the leaders of Mongolia's 1990 democratic revolution.

As a politician

Bat-Üül served as a chairman of the Democratic Party from 1990 to 1992, and as the party's general secretary from 1992 to 1996. He was elected into the People's Great Khural in 1990, and into the State Great Khural in 1996, 2004 and 2008, representing the Democratic Party. He was appointed as Mayor of Ulaanbaatar on August 7, 2012 by its City Council. He was awarded with the title of Hero of Mongolia for his role in the 1990 democratic revolution on December 10, 2009. He stepped down on July 7th, 2016, replaced by Mongolian People's Party's Sunduin Batbold.

References

Oliver Corff, Who Is Who der Mongolischen Politik: Bat-Üül, Ärdäniïn (Erdeniin Bat Uul) (in German)
Ардчилсан нам: УИХ дахь АН (in Mongolian)

1957 births
Living people
Democratic Party (Mongolia) politicians
Members of the State Great Khural
People from Ulaanbaatar
National University of Mongolia alumni